Leandro Henrique de Oliveira Bravin or simply Leandro Bravin (born May 13, 1986 in Maringá), is a Brazilian attacking midfielder. His Atlético-PR contract expired in September 2007.

External links
 furacao
 CBF

1986 births
Living people
Brazilian footballers
Club Athletico Paranaense players
Association football midfielders